Les Contrebandières, known in English as The Smugglers, is a 1967 film by French director Luc Moullet; it was his second feature film.

References

External links 
 

1967 films
French black-and-white films
1960s French-language films
1960s French films